The government of the Mughal Empire was a highly centralised bureaucracy, most of which was instituted during the rule of the third Mughal emperor, Akbar.  The central government was headed by the Mughal emperor; immediately beneath him were four ministries. The finance/revenue ministry was responsible for controlling revenues from the empire's territories, calculating tax revenues, and using this information to distribute assignments. The ministry of the military (army/intelligence) was headed by an official titled mir bakhshi, who was in charge of military organisation, messenger service, and the mansabdari system. The ministry in charge of law/religious patronage was the responsibility of the sadr as-sudr, who appointed judges and managed charities and stipends. Another ministry was dedicated to the imperial household and public works.

Provinces 
The empire was divided into a number of subahs (provinces), each of which was headed by a provincial governor called a subahdar. The structure of the central government was mirrored at the provincial level; each subah had its own bakhshi, sadr as-sudr, and finance minister that reported directly to the central government rather than the subahdar.

Subahs were subdivided into administrative units known as sarkars, which were further divided into groups of villages known as parganas. The government at the pargana level consisted of a Muslim judge and a local tax collector.

Capitals 
The Mughals had multiple imperial capitals, established over the course of their rule. These were the cities of Agra, Delhi, Lahore, and Fatehpur Sikri. Power often shifted back and forth between these capitals. Sometimes this was necessitated by political and military demands, but shifts also occurred for ideological reasons (for example, Akbar's establishment of Fatehpur Sikri), or even simply because the cost of establishing a new capital was marginal. Situations where there were two simultaneous capitals happened multiple times in Mughal history. Certain cities also served as short-term, provincial capitals, as was the case with Aurangzeb's shift to Aurangabad in the Deccan.

The imperial camp, used for military expeditions and royal tours, also served as a kind of mobile, "de facto" administrative capital. From the time of Akbar, Mughal camps were huge in scale, accompanied by numerous personages associated with the royal court, as well as soldiers and labourers. All administration and governance was carried out within them. The Mughal Emperors spent a significant portion of their ruling period within these camps.

After Aurangzeb, the Mughal capital definitively became the walled city of Shahjahanabad (today Old Delhi).

Law 

The Mughal Empire's legal system was context-specific and evolved over the course of the empire's rule. Being a Muslim state, the empire employed fiqh (Islamic jurisprudence) and therefore the fundamental institutions of Islamic law such as those of the qadi (judge), mufti (jurisconsult), and muhtasib (censor and market supervisor) were well-established in the Mughal Empire. However, the dispensation of justice also depended on other factors, such as administrative rules, local customs, and political convenience. This was due to Persianate influences on Mughal ideology, and the fact that the Mughal Empire governed a non-Muslim majority.

Legal ideology 
The Mughal Empire followed the Sunni Hanafi system of jurisprudence. In its early years, the empire relied on Hanafi legal references inherited from its predecessor, the Delhi Sultanate. These included the al-Hidaya (the best guidance) and the Fatawa al-Tatarkhaniyya (religious decisions of the Emire Tatarkhan). During the Mughal Empire's peak, the Al-Fatawa al-'Alamgiriyya was commissioned by Emperor Aurangzeb. This compendium of Hanafi law sought to serve as a central reference for the Mughal state that dealt with the specifics of the South Asian context.

The Mughal Empire also drew on Persianate notions of kingship. Particularly, this meant that the Mughal emperor was considered the supreme authority on legal affairs.

Courts of law 
Various kinds of courts existed in the Mughal empire. One such court was that of the qadi. The Mughal qadi was responsible for dispensing justice; this included settling disputes, judging people for crimes, and dealing with inheritances and orphans. The qadi also had additional importance with regards to documents, as the seal of the qadi was required to validate deeds and tax records. Qadis did not constitute a single position, but made up a hierarchy. For example, the most basic kind was the pargana (district) qadi. More prestigious positions were those of the qadi al-quddat (judge of judges) who accompanied the mobile imperial camp, and the qadi-yi lashkar (judge of the army). Qadis were usually appointed by the emperor or the sadr-us-sudr (chief of charities). The jurisdiction of the qadi was availed by Muslims and non-Muslims alike.

The jagirdar (local tax collector) was another kind of official approached, especially for high-stakes cases. Subjects of the Mughal Empire also took their grievances to the courts of superior officials who held more authority and punitive power than the local qadi. Such officials included the kotwal (local police), the faujdar (an officer controlling multiple districts and troops of soldiers), and the most powerful, the subahdar (provincial governor). In some cases, the emperor themself dispensed justice directly. Jahangir was known to have installed a "chain of justice" in the Agra fort that any aggrieved subject could shake to get the attention of the emperor and bypass the inefficacy of officials.

Self-regulating tribunals operating at the community or village level were common, but sparse documentation of them exists. For example, it is unclear how panchayats (village councils) operated in the Mughal era.

List of Mughal Emperors

See also 
 Mughal dynasty
 Mughal emperors
 Economy of the Mughal Empire
 Foreign relations of the Mughal Empire
 Islam in South Asia

Further reading 

 
 Habib, Irfan. Atlas of the Mughal Empire: Political and Economic Maps (1982).

References 

Mughal Empire

History of India